Drip-Along Daffy is a 1951 Warner Bros. Merrie Melodies theatrical cartoon short, directed by Chuck Jones and written by Michael Maltese. The cartoon was released on November 17, 1951, and stars Daffy Duck and Porky Pig.

This cartoon was produced as a parody of Westerns which were popular at the time of its release, and features Daffy Duck as a "Western-Type Hero", who, with his trusty "Comedy Relief" (Porky Pig) hopes to clean up a violence-filled "one-horse town". In a tongue-in-cheek nod to The Lone Ranger, Daffy's horse is named "Tinfoil". The cartoon includes an original song (sung by Porky) called "The Flower of Gower Gulch", a parody of sentimental cowboy-style love songs, Gower Gulch being an intersection in Hollywood known as a gathering spot for would-be actors in early Westerns.

Drip-Along Daffy featured the first appearance of the villain character Nasty Canasta, a Mexican rogue who would resurface in several later Jones cartoons, as well as an episode of The Sylvester and Tweety Mysteries, the movie Looney Tunes: Back in Action in 2003, and occasionally on the Duck Dodgers TV series.

Plot
Daffy, introduced as a "Western-Type Hero" and Porky, introduced as the "Comedy Relief", ride along the desert until they come across the small "Lawless Western Town" of Snake-Bite Center, which is so full of violence that the population sign immediately goes down a number when someone is shot and killed (while the town cemetery's population sign immediately goes up a number); the most recent casualty is the last sheriff. In a recorded commentary on the Looney Tunes Golden Collection, the commentator warns the viewer that "this film is literally stuffed with every western cliché ever done." This is illustrated in such spoof scenes as follows: a man is firing guns while chasing another man; both stop at a traffic light so a second pair can cross, then their chase resumes. Two riders on horseback casually approach one another; when they are in close proximity, the horses recoil and whinny in anger, then begin shooting at each other. Other scenes include: a holdup at "Custard's Last Stand"; a masked horse stealing horseshoes from a smithy at gunpoint; a gunman shot off someone's balcony is caught by waiting stretcher-bearers, who trot him off to "Rigor O'Mortis / The Smiling Undertaker"...whose funeral parlor towers several stories above the neighboring buildings.

Seeing the "Sheriff Wanted" sign, Daffy picks a sheriff badge out of his collection of badges and rides into town on his horse, Tinfoil, with Porky following behind on his donkey (accompanied, of course, by "The William Tell Overture," which gained even greater fame as the theme song of "The Lone Ranger"). At the saloon, Daffy is about to enjoy a pasteurized milkshake and swami yogurt-chaser...when Nasty Canasta walks in past his 'Wanted' poster (which states "$5,000,000 REWARD (DEAD)" and "RUSTLER, BANDIT, SQUARE DANCE CALLER"). Daffy tries to intimidate Canasta with his gun ("Stick 'em up, homber! You're under arrest"), but Canasta just bites off most of the gun and eats it ("Probably didn't have his i-ron today!"). Canasta then threateningly orders himself and Daffy "two of the usual", a drink made of various poisons and toxic materials like cobra fang juice, hydrogen bitters and old panther (so hot that when two ice cubes are put in it, they jump out, yelping and bouncing into a fire bucket to cool off). Canasta downs the drink with no side effects (other than his hat flipping); Daffy gets Porky to drink the other one, and Porky comes through seemingly with no side effects either. So, Daffy demands one for himself and pours it down his throat. A few seconds later, Daffy and Porky exhibit wild side effects, including reciting "Mary had a Little Lamb" in Elmer Fudd-ese, turning green, and acting like they are motorized; Daffy's bullets shoot by themselves and create a hole in the floor, which he falls into, then rockets out of before coming back to Earth. As he floats down, Daffy sternly says to Canasta "I hate you." Eventually, Daffy challenges Canasta to a showdown in the street.

Daffy and Canasta start walking towards each other, the street deserted (with camera angles designed to parody the showdown camera angles common in Western films of that era), when Porky takes matters into his hands by winding up a small British toy soldier and letting it go towards Canasta, accompanied by Raymond Scott's "The Toy Trumpet". Canasta picks up the toy, chuckling, until it points its gun at Canasta and fires, sending Canasta to the ground. With Canasta defeated, the rest of the people in town rush over to Porky, while Daffy is still pacing his way to the middle of the street. Daffy finally notices the adoration given to Porky, and in vain tries to get their attention ("Gimme the cheers! Give me … Give me - Give - Give me one dozen roses."). Porky is now the town sheriff, and Daffy reiterates his claim that he would "clean up this one-horse town" to the camera — except now he is a sanitation worker. Porky remarks: "L-l-l-lucky for him [Daffy] it is a one-horse town."

Reception
Andrew Farago writes, "The prevailing theory about acting has always been that an absolutely great actor will lose himself in any role he plays... Daffy Duck, on the other hand, didn't get where he is today by playing by the rules. Whether he's a bellhop, a talent scout, a beloved pet, a space-faring adventurer, a scarlet-clad swashbuckler, or a cowboy, Daffy Duck is Daffy Duck is Daffy Duck." Commenting on Daffy and Porky's roles, he says, "Drip-Along Daffy marks an important turning point in their careers, as the Warner Bros. animation stable realized that the eternally optimistic, steadfast, and — dare we say it, competent — sidekick role made Porky the perfect foil for a certain irrepressible duck."

In popular culture
 A portion of this cartoon appeared in the 1991 movie JFK. In the scene where Jim Garrison (Kevin Costner) and his family are at the dinner table, one of his youngest children is watching this cartoon.

Home media
This cartoon is included with the original ending restored in Disc Two of Looney Tunes Golden Collection: Volume 1 and Disc Two of Looney Tunes Platinum Collection: Volume 2.

See also
List of cartoons featuring Daffy Duck

References

External links

 

1951 films
1951 animated films
1951 short films
1950s Western (genre) comedy films
American Western (genre) comedy films
1950s parody films
Merrie Melodies short films
Short films directed by Chuck Jones
Daffy Duck films
Porky Pig films
Films scored by Carl Stalling
Films with screenplays by Michael Maltese
Western (genre) animated films
1951 comedy films
1950s Warner Bros. animated short films
1950s English-language films
Films set in deserts